Michael Augustin (born 26 April 1996) is an Austrian footballer who plays for SC Schwaz on loan from FC Wacker Innsbruck.

External links
 
 

1996 births
Living people
Austrian footballers
Austria youth international footballers
Association football midfielders
FC Wacker Innsbruck (2002) players